Erbessa avara is a moth of the family Notodontidae first described by Herbert Druce in 1899. It is found in Ecuador.

The larvae feed on Miconia species.

References

Moths described in 1899
Notodontidae of South America